The Yakovlev Yak-4 (Service names Yak-4, BB-22bis (Blizhnij Bombardirovschik, "short-range bomber")) was a Soviet light bomber used during World War II. It was developed from the Ya-22/Yak-2.

Design and development

The Yak-4 was an improved version of the Yak-2 with more powerful Klimov M-105 engines and a number of other changes that were made to try to rectify the problems of the Yak-2. The upper fuselage was redesigned to improve the gunner's field of fire and the oil coolers were relocated from the sides of the engine nacelles to the 'chin' position to improve their performance.

Operators

VVS

Specifications (Yak-4)

References

Further reading

External links

 Yak-4 description on aviation.ru

Yak-004
1940s Soviet bomber aircraft
World War II Soviet bombers
Aircraft first flown in 1940
Twin piston-engined tractor aircraft